Autosticha silacea is a moth in the family Autostichidae. It was described by John David Bradley in 1962. It is found on the New Hebrides.

References

Moths described in 1962
Autosticha
Moths of Oceania